C93 was a political party in Curaçao, the former Netherlands Antilles. At the legislative elections in the Netherlands Antilles of 18 January 2002, the party won 3.55% of the popular vote of Curaçao and none of the 14 Curaçao-seats in the Estates of the Netherlands Antilles. The party was dissolved in 2006.

References

Political parties in Curaçao